Jesús María Zubiarraín Arguiñano known as Zubiarraín (22 September 1945 – 1 June 1993) was a Spanish football goalkeeper.

Zubiarrain began his career with Real Sociedad in 1966. He played for Atlético Madrid between 1969 and 1973, winning the Spanish La Liga in 1970 and 1973 and the Copa del Rey in 1972.

References

1945 births
1993 deaths
Association football goalkeepers
Spanish footballers
Footballers from the Basque Country (autonomous community)
People from San Sebastián
Atlético Madrid footballers
Real Sociedad footballers